Andrew Hyatt is a Canadian country singer-songwriter from Sudbury, Ontario, most noted as a Canadian Country Music Award winner for Rising Star of the Year at the 2022 Canadian Country Music Awards. 

He was previously a nominee in the same category at the 2021 Canadian Country Music Awards.

Hyatt released the EP Never Back Down in 2015, and his full-length debut album Iron & Ashes was released in 2017. He received three nominations at the Country Music Association of Ontario awards in 2018, for Male Artist of the Year, Album of the Year and Rising Star of the Year. He followed up with the EPs Cain in 2018 and Abel in 2019. He supported the EPs with touring as an opening act for Dean Brody and Tim Hicks.

In 2020, he had begun a 36-date tour opening for Gord Bamford when the COVID-19 pandemic shut down the tour. He turned to further recording, releasing numerous EPs including Neverland (2020), The Wanderspace Sessions (2021), Wild Flowers (2021) and Four Good Years (2022).

References

21st-century Canadian male singers
Canadian male singer-songwriters
Canadian country singer-songwriters
Living people
Musicians from Greater Sudbury
Year of birth missing (living people)
Canadian Country Music Association Rising Star Award winners